Xeriscaping is the process of landscaping, or gardening, that reduces or eliminates the need for irrigation. It is promoted in regions that do not have accessible, plentiful, or reliable supplies of fresh water and has gained acceptance in other regions as access to irrigation water has become limited, though it is not limited to such climates. Xeriscaping may be an alternative to various types of traditional gardening.

In some areas, terms such as water-conserving landscaping, drought-tolerant landscaping, and smart scaping are used instead. The use of plants whose natural requirements are appropriate to the local climate is emphasized, and care is taken to avoid losing water to evaporation and runoff.  However, the specific plants used in xeriscaping vary based on climate as this strategy can be used in xeric, mesic, and hydric environments. Xeriscaping is different from natural landscaping, because the emphasis in xeriscaping is on selection of plants for water conservation, not necessarily selecting native plants.

Xeriscaping produces greenspaces that require low amounts of maintenance and irrigation, and promote biodiversity; however, due to societal norms and lack of landscape understanding, public perception of xeriscaping has frequently been negative, as some assume that these types of landscapes are ugly expanses of just cactus and gravel. However, studies have shown that education in water conservation practices and xeriscaping's benefits can greatly improve the public's perception of xeriscaping.

Etymology and similar terms 
The term zero-scaping (or zeroscaping) is sometimes substituted for xeriscaping due to phonetic similarity. When used seriously, zero-scaping usually refers to a different type of low-water landscaping that uses very few plants or none at all. Because o is the most common connecting vowel in Greco-Roman vocabulary, xeriscaping is sometimes misspelled as xeroscaping. Similar terms and phrases include water-conserving landscaping, drought-tolerant landscaping, and smart scaping.

Advantages 
Xeriscaping has the potential to reduce water usage and maintenance, improve biodiversity, lower pollution, as well as mitigate heat within urban areas; however, the effectiveness of this sustainable process has not been evaluated on a long-term large-scale basis. Xeriscaping utilizes native/indigenous vegetation as opposed to store bought grass and imported plants to retain water and minimize supplemental irrigation. Currently within the United States it was found that in arid climates (such as Arizona and Nevada) that 75% of households' potable water was used to water residential and urban lawns. Current climate conditions have increased the frequency of droughts, impacting the availability of fresh drinking water.  Xeriscaping helps preserve water for people and animals as it is more reliant on natural rainfall and minimal maintenance when compared to the current practiced greenspaces.

Water conservation and lower maintenance 
Xeriscapes can reduce water consumption by 60% or more compared to regular lawn landscapes. In Turkey, one of the first large scale xeriscaping evaluations was conducted. It was found that switching an average city park to more native vegetation in the region can lower irrigation usage by 30–50%. Assuming a water usage reduction of 30% it was found that a city can save roughly $2 million annually (however, this exact value is dependent on location). The use of native plants lowers the necessity of watering as the vegetation has already adapted to thrive in the climate and does not require assistance with irrigation or fertilization.  

The Leadership in Energy and Environmental Design program has recognized xeriscaping as an effective water reduction process and has started to incorporate credits in the certification process across all their programs for facilities that reduce their outside water use and irrigation. This credit can be met by using xeriscape strategies and efficient irrigation systems. This further validates the beneficial claims behind xeriscaping, and it is anticipated that more energy and environmental credit systems as well state ran programs will encourage and incentivize xeriscaping for greenspace development.

While evaluating the cost of annual maintenance and park construction, xeriscaping drastically lowers these costs by roughly 55% and 57%, respectively. Aside from occasional weeding and mulching Xeriscaping requires far less time and effort to maintain. This is the case because under xeriscaping principles the vegetation used for urban greenspaces are indigenous to the area; therefore, are less expensive and require less assistance to acclimate and survive in the environment when compared to imported vegetation. This means that the systems use less water as well as lower rates of pesticides, and fertilizers when compared to current urban and residential greenspaces; this further helps lower annual maintenance costs. Furthermore, maintenance waste, such as lawn clippings, contribute organic waste to landfills and fertilizers contribute to urban runoff pollution; however, xeriscaping eliminates these negative effects as clippings are encouraged to remain on the greenspace which allows for a lower use of fertilizers.

Biodiversity 
Often times when areas develop there is a loss of forestation, and animal populations dwindle as they are forced to relocate. Implementing native vegetation in green spaces helps improve the insect and wildlife found in the environment as the habitat is reestablished to a degree, offering food and shelter to the wildlife. One application of xeriscaping that drastically improves biodiversity is the implementation of pocket forests.

Environmental and thermal discomfort remediation 
Additionally, xeriscaping has been theorized to help offset the urban heating island (UHI) effect. UHI refers to the phenomenon in which urban areas are found to be hotter than neighboring rural sites due to large amounts of human activity. This temperature difference of a city area and its surroundings is usually higher at night as winds are lower and cannot dissipate the large amounts of heat generated in an urban area’s boundaries as readily. Upon investigating xeriscaping strategies in Phoenix, AZ, it was found that dry areas that utilized xeriscaping with shade trees were found to mitigate UHI effects during the day and night with an average temperature difference of roughly 2.5 oC (4.5 oF) cooler. However, when these same strategies were implemented in a mesic area, an environment with moderate amounts of moisture, it was found that thermal discomfort increased for residents and that these strategies had opposite effects to their intentions. Although xeriscaping strategies were found to mitigate UHI effects, it remains important to consider the climate and current landscape in which it is implemented in, in order to maximize its benefits and effectiveness.

Legal issue
Some homeowners associations (HOAs) have strict rules requiring a certain percentage of land to be used as lawns but these rules either have been or are in the process of being overturned in many areas. As it stands most states in arid and hot climate regions in the US have started to pass legislation that allows homeowners to design lawns using xeriscaping methods. These states are currently Texas, Nevada, Arizona, California, Colorado, Louisiana, and Florida. Most states currently do not have direct legislation regarding a homeowner’s right to landscape in relation to existing HOAs; however, most allow residents to at least protest HOA requirements and landscape their lawn with "reasonable" designs.

Principles 

Originally conceived by Denver Water, the seven design principles of xeriscaping have since expanded into simple and applicable concepts to creating landscapes that use less water. The principles are appropriate for multiple regions and can serve as a guide to creating a water conserving landscape that is regionally appropriate.

Plan and design
Create a diagram, drawn to scale, that shows the major elements of the landscape, such as impervious surfaces, existing vegetation, and other permanent elements.

Once a base plan of an existing site has been determined, the creation of a conceptual plan (bubble diagram) is done which shows the areas for turf, perennial beds, views, screens, slopes, etc. Once finished, the development of a planting plan that integrates plants into zones is done.

Soil amendment
Most plants will benefit from the use of a soil conditioner such as compost, which will help the soil retain water. However, some desert plants prefer gravel soils instead of well-amended soils. 

Plants can either fit the soil or the soil should be amended to fit the plants. Soil is essential to most plant growth, so it is important that this step is not overlooked or undervalued.

Efficient irrigation
A xeriscape can be irrigated efficiently by hand or with an automatic sprinkler system. In the design process it is recommended that turf areas are zoned separately from other plant sections, and that efficient irrigation methods used appropriately for each zone. For grass, use gear-driven rotors, or rotary spray nozzles, that have larger droplets and low angles to avoid wind drift. While drip line or bubbler emitters are most efficient for watering trees, shrubs, flowers and groundcovers.

If watering by hand, avoid oscillating sprinklers and other devices that throw water high in the air or release a fine mist. The most efficient sprinklers release big drops close to the ground.

When irrigating it is important to water deeply and infrequently to develop deep roots and healthy plants. To reduce water lost to evaporation, watering should be avoided during the day. The use of automatic sprinkling systems is highly encouraged as well as adjusting the controller monthly to accommodate weather conditions. It is often recommended to also install a rain sensor to shut off the device when it rains.

Appropriate plant and zone selection
Greenspaces often have differing environmental conditions when considering amount of light per day (due to building shadows), wind, and moisture. To minimize water waste, it is essential to group together plants with similar light and water needs, and place them in areas of the greenspace that match these requirements; for example, moderate-water-use plants should be placed in low-lying drainage areas, near downspouts, or in the shade of other plants. Turf typically requires the most water and shrub/perennial beds will require approximately half the amount of water as the turf. Planting a variety of plants with different heights, color, and textures creates interest and beauty as well as promotes biodiversity.

Mulch
Mulch keeps plant roots cool, prevents soil from crusting, minimizes evaporation, and reduces weed growth. Organic mulches, such as bark chips, pole peelings, or wood grindings, should be applied 2 to 4 inches deep to help promote root growth. Fiber mulches create a web that is more resistant to wind and rain washout. When using inorganic mulches, such as rocks and gravel, they should be applied 2 to 3 inches deep. Surrounding plants with rock makes the area hotter as they absorb sunlight, so it is recommended to limit this practice when xeriscaping.

Limited turf areas

Turf areas use the most water so it is important to use the appropriate grass as well as limit the amount of grass in the environment. Native grasses (warm-season) that have been cultivated for turf lawns, such as buffalo grass and blue grama, can survive with a quarter of the water that bluegrass varieties need. Warm-season grasses are greenest in June through September and may go dormant during colder months.

Native grasses (cool season) such as bluegrass and tall fescue, are greenest in the spring and fall and go dormant in the high heat of the summer. New cultivars of bluegrass, such as Reveille, and tall fescue, can reduce typical bluegrass water requirements by at least 30%. Fine fescues can provide substantial water savings and are best used in areas that receive low traffic or highly shaded locations.

Maintenance
All landscapes require some degree of care during the year. Turf requires spring and fall aeration along with regular fertilization every 6 to 8 weeks. Additionally, the turf should be cut to a height of 3 inches with a bagless lawnmower, allowing the clippings to fall. Trees, shrubs, and perennials will need occasional pruning to remove dead stems, promote blooming, or control height and spread. To promote zero waste and avoid adding organic materials to landfills, the removed plant material can be shredded and used in composting piles.

Lawns and applications

One of the major challenges to the public acceptance of xeriscaping is the cultural attachment to turf grass lawns. Originally implemented in England, lawns have become in some regions a symbol of prosperity, order, and community. Despite the high water, fertilizer, and maintenance costs associated with lawns, they have become the social norm in urban and suburban areas, even if they are rarely used for recreational or other purposes. Xeriscaping offers an alternative to the over-use of turf grass lawns, but are not widely accepted because of preconceived notions of what it means to xeriscape. Xeriscaping can include lawn areas but seeks to reduce them to areas that will actually be used, rather than using them as a default landscaping plan. Furthermore, xeriscaping is closely linked to movements and ideologies that advocate for more natural vegetation in residential and urban areas. One form of xeriscaping that has received a lot of attention is the implementation of pocket forests.

Akira Miyawaki is a Japanese botanist that developed the idea of pocket forests which reintroduces indigenous trees and vegetation to developed environments in order to promote strong biodiversity. The method calls for the planting naturally occurring trees and shrubbery densely into small compact areas, that can range from a size of a tennis court to a parking space. These pocket forests increase biodiversity, reduce noise (if placed near streets or noise polluters), improve air quality and soil retention, help with reforestation, and efficiently capture carbon dioxide. In order to promote fast growth and biodiversity the engineered ecosystem requires a layering of vegetation: the ground layer, a shrub layer, and a canopy layer.  Due to this compact layering these forests usually are well established within two decades rather than the 70-plus years it takes for naturally occurring forests.

Other forms of xeriscaping include rain gardens. These gardens are used to reduce the amount of runoff from impervious areas (such as roofs, driveways, sidewalks, etc.) and rely on water retentive plants and soil mediums to help filter pollutants from the storm water before it is reintroduced into aquifers and storm drains. These gardens require little irrigation and maintenance, and help protect waterways and remove pollutants.

There are many other forms and applications of xeriscaping: it is essentially any form of landscaping that requires little to no irrigation. However, it is important to take note of the environment before implementation, and follow the principles, as success of one type of xeriscape in a xeric climate might not have the same effects if it were implemented in a mesic or hydric environment.

See also

 Climate-friendly gardening
 Dryland farming
 Foodscaping
 Masanobu Fukuoka
 Gardening
 International Center for Agricultural Research in the Dry Areas
 Native plant
 Natural landscaping
 Rainwater harvesting
 Sustainable farming
 Sustainable gardening
 Sustainable landscape architecture
 Wildlife garden

References

External links

Deserts and xeric shrublands
Desert greening
Sustainable gardening
Types of garden
Water conservation